John Pong Shying (b. ca. 1796, Canton, China; d. 18 June 1880, Sydney, Australia) was the first known Chinese born settler to Australia, arriving in 1818. (date and place of death is actually unknown - the quoted date is that of John Sheen whose DNA has been shown to be different. Descendants are still trying to place his movements after 1844). He was known by many names, including Mak Sai Ying, Mak Sai Pang, Mai Shi Ying, Mark Opong, and (reputedly but contrary to DNA evidence) also John Sheen.

Arriving via the Laurel in February 1818, he landed at Port Jackson. 

He worked as a carpenter, living with John Blaxland on his Newington Estate. After three years, he worked at Elizabeth Farm for Elizabeth Macarthur, the pastoralist.

He married Sarah Jane Thompson (b: abt 1802, United Kingdom d: 27 March 1836, Parramatta) on 3 February 1823 in St John's Church of England, Parramatta. They had four sons: John James Shying (1823–1885), George Hugh Shying (1826–1893), James Henry Shying (1828–1891), Thomas Jones Shying (1830–1894).

It is believed a linen press, made for Elizabeth MacArthur (in 1824), still exists, and is on display at Milton House museum. The item may have been made without nails. The bookkeepers entry of payment still exists.

Shying returned to China for five years, from 1831 to 1836. He may have worked as a port liaison. He returned to Sydney, on the death of his first wife. The first opium war began two years later. During this time, land he negotiated for from the NSW Colony had been allocated elsewhere. Sarah had a letter from the Attorney General of NSW explaining why the land had been re allocated.

He married Bridget Gillorley on 10 October 1842, but she died some six months later.

He is known to have negotiated a sale of the Peacock Inn in Parramatta, New South Wales (a western suburb of Sydney) in 1844. He had been the builder.

His grandson, John Joseph Shying, was possibly the first Chinese-Australian to serve in the Australian army.

References

External links 

An Alien in the Antipodes
Australian Heritage Commission
Public Seminar from Australia's National University ANU
Australian National Museum

1880 deaths
Chinese emigrants to Australia
Year of birth missing
Chinese-Australian history